Herlina Christine Natalia Hakim (born 25 December 1956) is an Indonesian actress, film producer, and activist. Born to a devout Muslim family of a mixed-race background in Jambi, she grew up in Yogyakarta, aspiring to be an architect or psychologist. This changed after she was discovered by Teguh Karya for his 1973 movie Cinta Pertama, a role which garnered her a Citra Award for Best Actress and convinced her to follow a career in acting. Since then, she has starred in numerous films, including 1977's Badai Pasti Berlalu and 1988's Tjoet Nja' Dhien; she also had a minor role in the 2010 Hollywood movie Eat Pray Love. , she has won six Citra Awards, received a lifetime achievement award from the Cinemanila International Film Festival, and served as a member of the jury at the Cannes Film Festival.

Hakim began branching out from acting in 1998, beginning with roles as producer of Daun di Atas Bantal and Pasir Berbisik and eventually spreading to documentary film-making and an activist for education and autism. Beginning in 2008, she has served as Indonesia's goodwill ambassador to UNESCO, focusing on educational issues.

Biography
Hakim was born in Kuala Tungkal, Jambi on 25 December 1956, but grew up in Yogyakarta. She is of mixed descent, with her relatives coming from Padang, Aceh, Banten, Pekalongan, Madiun, and the Middle East; this caused her to question her identity as a child and teenager. Despite being devout Muslims, her parents named her Christine and Natalia because she was born on Christmas Day.

Originally, Hakim did not intend to be an actress, but an architect or psychologist. However, she was cast in Teguh Karya's 1973 film Cinta Pertama after he saw pictures of her modelling in a magazine; despite only modelling to help her friend and not wanting to act, she was unable to decline Karya's request for fear of being impolite to such a "warm and friendly" person. She later described Karya as having "reeled [her] in, slowly, slowly, like a fisherman," and considered leaving acting after wrapping up filming. Her work in Cinta Pertama garnered her a Citra Award for Best Actress, which convinced her to continue acting. Karya later told her that he had fought with his producer over her casting; the producer expressed concern that Hakim was "too thin and had no chest," to which Karya replied "are we selling a film or are we selling breasts?"

The following year, Hakim starred in another Karya-directed film, Kawin Lari (Elope). The experience gave her a greater understanding of acting, causing her to "see life from a different perspective in studying [her] character." It was followed by a role in 1976's Sesuatu yang Indah (Something Beautiful), directed by Wim Umboh. Sesuatu yang Indah was the first film in which Hakim used her own voice; her voice had been dubbed by Titi Qadarsih in previous movies; Hakim's own voice had been considered "too heavy." The next year, she starred in Badai Pasti Berlalu, appearing on the poster and the cover of the soundtrack album.

Hakim presented 14 Indonesian films at the Nantes Three Continents Festival in November 1983; she had acted in half of them. Two years later she became an observer at the Cannes Film Festival, striking up a working relationship with Pierre Risient, who later assisted her in bringing her films to Cannes.

One of these was Eros Djarot's 1988 film Tjoet Nja' Dhien, in which Hakim was cast as Acehnese guerilla leader Cut Nyak Dhien. It won the 1989 Cannes Film Festival award for Best International Film, being screened in Le Semaine de Critique. Hakim later described the role as a "huge honour" and "very challenging"; she has credited the role for answering her questions on her identity. The film later became Indonesia's submission to the 62nd Academy Awards for the Academy Award for Best Foreign Language Film.

Hakim screened her first work as a producer, Daun di Atas Bantal (Leaf on a Pillow) during Un Certain Regard at Cannes ten years later. When producing the film, she chose young director Garin Nugroho, whom she perceived to be highly talented; she also took the leading role. During production, she made a mistake that required the reshooting of all footage. In an attempt to cut expenses, she had saved all cans of exposed film to send to the developing lab at once; the lab then notified her that a technical fault with the camera had rendered all of it unusable and that the problem could have been detected earlier had she sent each can as it was filmed.

Another production, 2001's Pasir Berbisik (Whispering Sands), went more smoothly. The film, which Hakim co-produced and played the leading role, was screened at the Deauville Asian Film Festival. The following year she was appointed to the jury of the Cannes Film Festival, along with Michelle Yeoh. In 2005 she received a special tribute during the opening ceremony of the 7th Deauville Asian Film Festival.

In 2003, Hakim began to work with RCTI and Metro TV on the TV show Untukmu Guru (For You, Teacher). Five years later, Hakim was selected Indonesia's voluntary goodwill ambassador for UNESCO; she has used the position to promote education, push for education reforms in Indonesia, and promote disaster relief programs in South-East Asia.

Hakim's first Hollywood experience came in 2010, Hakim played Wayan, a Balinese jamu seller, alongside Julia Roberts in Eat Pray Love. Arriving in Bali three days before shooting, she found herself rushed to read the script, be fitted, and rid herself of her green hair. She met with the person her character was based on to prepare for her role. That same year, Hakim accepted a FIAPF Award for her "outstanding achievements"; she compared the award to Viagra, saying that it "make[s] [her] stronger to satisfy [audiences]".

Hakim is also a documentary filmmaker. She has made a documentary on the Indonesian UNESCO World Heritage Sites, and in 2011 produced a documentary on autism to "educate the public" that was released to coincide with World Autism Awareness Day. , she is producing a documentary on the Dayak people of Kalimantan. She is considering making a fiction film based on their culture.

In 2020, Hakim won the Citra Award for Best Supporting Actress for her role in Joko Anwar's horror film Impetigore. The film is the first horror film of Hakim's career.

Activism
Beginning in the early 2000s, Hakim became an activist, with a focus on education. After the 2004 Indian Ocean earthquake and tsunami, she went on numerous humanitarian trips to Aceh. She later founded the Christine Hakim feature, a foundation to promote public education about autism. She has urged the government to eliminate misconceptions regarding autism, calling the refusal to accept autistic students in public schools "a violation of human rights".

Personal life
In 2000, Hakim married Dutchman Jeroen Lezer, an actor, filmsales director and writer. They live in Cibubur, East Jakarta, with Hakim's mother and daughter Shena; Bruce Emond of The Jakarta Post describes her home as being "like a lush secret garden amid the creeping suburbia".

Hakim generally avoids discussing her personal life with the press and is unwilling to discuss topics that are not of public interest. In 1992 she said that "90 percent of the journalists here aren't interested in [her] films, they just want to know about [her] private life."

Legacy
Hakim has been described as the "grande dame of Indonesian cinema" as well as "Indonesia’s foremost actress". She has also received a lifetime achievement award at the Cinemanila International Film Festival. Hakim has refused a position on the Asia Pacific Screen Awards numerous times, due to being unable to reconcile her schedule with the awards.

Filmography

 Cinta Pertama (First Love; 1973)
 Atheis (Atheist; 1974)
 Ranjang Pengantin (Wedding Bed; 1974)
 Kawin Lari (Elope; 1975)
 Si Doel Anak Modern (Doel the Modern Child; 1976)
 Hapuslah Airmata Mu (Shed Your Tears; 1976)
 Sesuatu yang Indah (Something Beautiful; 1977)
 Badai Pasti Berlalu (The Storm Will Surely Pass; 1977)
 Petualang-Petualang (Wanderers; 1977)
 Pengemis dan Tukang Becak (The Beggar and the Pedicab Driver; 1978)
 Dr. Siti Pertiwi (1980)
 Seputih Hatinya, Semerah Bibirnya (As White as the Heart, as Red as the Lips; 1982)
 Di Balik Kelambu (Behind the Screen; 1982)
 Ponirah Terpidana (Ponirah is Convicted; 1984)
 Kerikil-Kerikil Tajam (Sharp Pebbles; 1984)
 Tjoet Nja' Dhien (1988)
 Sleeping Man (1996)
 De Gordel van Smaragd - Netherlands (1997) (The Tropic of Emerald; 1997) 
 Daun di Atas Bantal (Leaf on a Pillow; 1998)
 Pasir Berbisik (Whispering Sands; 2001)
 Puteri Gunung Ledang (Princess of Mount Ledang, 2004)
 Merantau (Find Oneself; 2009)
 Jamila dan Sang Presiden (Jamila and the President; 2009)
 Eat Pray Love (2010)
 Sang Kiai (2013) (The Clerics; 2013)
 Pendekar Tongkat Emas (2014) (The Golden Cane Warrior; 2014)
 De Reis - Netherlands (Short) (2014) (The Journey; 2014)
 Guru Bangsa HOS Tjokroaminoto (2014) (HOS Tjokroaminoto: Teacher of the People; 2014)
 Ibu Maafkan Aku (2016) 
 Boven Digoel (2016)
 Kartini (2017) 
 Perias Mayat (2017)
 Dancing in the Rain (2018)
 Perempuan Tanah Jahanam (2019)
 A Perfect Fit (2021)
 The Last of Us (episode Infected) (2023)

Awards and nominations

References

Works cited
Bibliography

 

Online sources

External links

 
 Christine Hakim at UNESCO
 Interview with Christine Hakim

1956 births
Living people
Indonesian film actresses
Indonesian Muslims
Indonesian people of Yemeni descent
Indonesian people of Lebanese descent
Indonesian people of Egyptian descent
Acehnese people
Minangkabau people
People from Jakarta
Citra Award winners
Maya Award winners
People from Jambi
UNESCO Goodwill Ambassadors
Winners of the Nikkei Asia Prize
Indonesian people of Malay descent